A tailspin is a rapid, high-rotation descent of an airplane.

Tailspin may also refer to:

 Loss of direction and stability in life, possibly due to loss of self-control
 "Tailspin" (1934 song), a 1934 song written by Jimmy Dorsey and Frankie Trumbauer
 "Tailspin", a song by American rock band moe. from their 2007 album The Conch
 "Tailspin", a song by guitarist Vinnie Moore from his 2007 album To the Core
 Tailspin, the name of DandiLion Park's signature roller coaster
 Tail Spin (Dreamworld), a aviation themed ride at Dreamworld
 Tailspin (Transformers), a fictional character
 Tail Spin, a 1939 aviation film
 Tailspin: Behind the Korean Airliner Tragedy, the US title of the 1989 British television film Coded Hostile, telling the story of Korean Air Flight 007
 TaleSpin, an animated TV series that used characters from the Disney animated film The Jungle Book
 TaleSpin (video game), a video game based on the TV series
 TaleSpin (Capcom), another video game based on the TV series
 TailSpin, a 2008 novel by Catherine Coulter
 Tailspin, a 2018 novel by Sandra Brown
 Tailspin: The People and Forces Behind America's Fifty-Year Fall—and Those Fighting to Reverse It, a 2018 nonfiction book by Steven Brill